The PGGMB Building was constructed in 2003, is the third tallest building in Brunei after The DST Group Building. The Building was listed as the sixth tallest Building in Borneo just about 295 feet high.

See also
List of towers

Buildings and structures in Brunei
Office buildings in Brunei